Hinrik Funhof (died 1485, also spelled Henrik Funhof) was a late Gothic painter who lived and worked in Hamburg. After the death of his colleague Hans Bornemann in 1475, he took over Bornemann's studio and married his widow. When Funhof died ten years later, she remarried to another Hamburg painter, Absolon Stumme.

Works

Only a few of his works survive, namely:

The Virgin Mary with Headdress (ca. 1480, DE: Maria mit Ährenkleid), in the collection of the Hamburger Kunsthalle
The Marriage at Cana (ca. 1481, DE: Hochzeit zu Kana, in a private collection.
The outer sides of the wings of the 1482 Altarpiece in St. John's Church, Lüneburg

See also
 List of German painters

References 
 Dörte Zbikowski: Zum Beispiel: Hinrik Funhof, in: Die Kunst des Mittelalters in Hamburg. Aufsätze zur Kulturgeschichte. Stiftung Denkmalpflege. Hamburg. 
 
 Gmelin, Hans Georg. "Funhof, Hinrik." In Grove Art Online. Oxford Art Online,  (accessed 3 February 2012; subscription required).

External links 
 
 Entry for Hinrik Funhof on the Union List of Artist Names

1485 deaths
15th-century German painters
German male painters
Gothic painters
Artists from Hamburg
Year of birth unknown